The Indo-European Etymological Dictionary (commonly abbreviated IEED) is a research project of the Department of Comparative Indo-European Linguistics at Leiden University, initiated in 1991 by Peter Schrijver and others. It is financially supported by the Faculty of Humanities and Centre for Linguistics of Leiden University, Brill Publishers, and the Netherlands Organisation for Scientific Research.

Overview
The IEED project is supervised by Alexander Lubotsky. It aims to accomplish the following goals:

 to compile etymological databases for the individual branches of Indo-European, containing all the words that can be traced back to Proto-Indo-European, and print them in Brill's Leiden Indo-European Etymological Dictionary series,
 to publish those databases free of charge electronically on the Internet, by utilizing Sergei Starostin's STARLING software technology,
 finally, once the etymological dictionaries of the individual branches have been compiled, to create a new large Indo-European etymological dictionary that will serve as a replacement of Julius Pokorny's outdated but still immensely valuable Indogermanisches etymologisches Wörterbuch.

Contributors by branch
Albanian: Bardhyl Demiraj, Michiel de Vaan
Anatolian: Alwin Kloekhorst
Armenian: Hrach Martirosyan
Baltic: Rick Derksen
Celtic: Ranko Matasović
Germanic: Guus Kroonen
Old Frisian: Dirk Boutkan, Sjoerd Siebinga
Greek: Robert Beekes
Indo-Iranian:
Indo-Aryan: Alexander Lubotsky
Iranian: Garnik Asatrian
Iranian verbs: Johnny Cheung
Italic: Michiel de Vaan
Slavic: Rick Derksen
Tocharian: Michaël Peyrot

Printed works
The project has so far resulted in the following printed works:

See also 

 Indo-European studies
 Lexikon der indogermanischen Verben (LIV, published 1998 and 2001 by Helmut Rix and others)
 Proto-Indo-European language

References

External links
  (2011 archive)
 Leiden Indo-European Etymological Dictionary Series, Brill Academic Publishers

Etymological dictionaries
Indo-European linguistics works
Brill Publishers books